{{infobox book
| name              = Brihat Tantrasara
| title_orig        = 
| translator        = Sri Chandra Kumar Tarkalankara
| image             = 
| image_caption     = 
| author            = Krishnananda Agambagish  Editor: Rasik Mohon Chattapadhhayay| illustrator       = 
| cover_artist      = 
| country           = India
| language          = Bengali
| series            = 
| subject           = Bengali Shaktism, Kali puja
| genre             = Tantra
| publisher         = Nababharat Publishers
| release_date      = Falgun, 1285 Bangabda
| english_release_date = 
| media_type        = Printed texts
| pages             = 771
| isbn              = 
| preceded_by       = 
| followed_by       = 
}}
Brihat Tantrasara or Tantrasara is a famous work on the social worship system of the various goddesses of the Dasamahavidya mentioned in various texts of Tantra Sadhana. Krishnananda Agambagish, a well-versed Tantric devotee of Tantra, wrote the famous book Brihat Tantrasara'' based on 170 Tantra Sadhana texts. This famous work of him is appreciated all over the country. Krishnananda was liberal, he had no bigotry about religion. Therefore, Tantrasara texts have been inserted by taking the essence of Tantra texts of Shaiva, Ganapathi, Shakta, Vaishnavism and Solar community.

References

Additional reading 
 

Hindu tantra
Shaktism